The Tupolev ANT-9 was a Soviet passenger aircraft of the 1930s. It was developed as a reaction to the demand for a domestic airliner. At this time Deruluft, one of the forerunners of Aeroflot, flew only with foreign models, which were mainly German or Dutch.

Design work began in December 1927. The first prototype, named Krylia Sovietov (Wings of the Soviets) used three French Gnome-Rhone Titan radial engines. It was presented to the public on 1 May 1929 at Red Square and it went to the national flight testing, which was completed in June. In the first series 12 aircraft were built. In production, the Titan engines were replaced with M-26 engines, but these proved too unreliable and were replaced with imported Wright Whirlwind engines. Two of these airplanes were used by Deruluft, starting from 1933 on the Berlin-Moscow service. Mikhail Gromov accomplished a European round flight on the route Moscow – Travemünde – Berlin – Paris – Rome – Marseille – London – Paris – Berlin – Warsaw – Moscow with the Krylia Sovietov, which lasted from 10 July to 8 August 1929 and generated considerable publicity.

In September 1930, testing of the Wright-powered version of the ANT-9 was completed. A few were used as executive transports for the Soviet Air Forces. A military variant with standard and retractable turrets was under construction, but was abandoned before trials began. An ambulance version was studied and considered, but never built. In 1932, GVF engineer Sergei Ivanovich Komarov proposed a modification of the ANT-9 wing to accommodate two M-17 engines, similar to what was done on the R-6. Production began in 1933 as the PS-9 (passenger airplane). The number of aircraft built amounted to about 70 machines. Up to the beginning of the German invasion of the Soviet Union, they served as passenger or staff airplanes mainly on routes in Central Asia and the Caucasus. Afterwards they were used until 1943 as transportation and medical airplanes. One PS-9 was modified into a propaganda aircraft named Krokodil (Crocodile) with a reptile-like plywood nose.

Operators

Military operators

Soviet Air Force

Turkish Air Force

Civil operators

Aeroflot
Deruluft

Turkish Airlines

Accidents and incidents
 On December 6, 1936, a Deruluft ANT-9, registration CCCP-D311, crashed near Moscow due to pilot error, killing nine of 14 on board.

Specifications (PS-9)

See also

References

Further reading

External links

 

1930s Soviet airliners
ANT-09
Trimotors
High-wing aircraft
Aircraft first flown in 1929